Girlband or "girl band" can refer to:

 An all-female band, where all members of a musical group are female
 A girl group, where only the singers are female
 Girlband (Australian band), a pop group
 Girlband (English band), contestants on The X Factor
 Gilla Band, rock band previously known as Girl Band
 Girl Band, a 2000 television film starring Matthew Lawrence

See also
 Girl (band), an English glam metal band
 Girls (band), an American indie rock band